The School of Engineering and Management Vaud or the School of Business and Engineering Vaud (abbrev. HEIG-VD, in the official French form Haute Ecole d'Ingénierie et de Gestion du Canton de Vaud) is a public university in Yverdon-les-Bains, Switzerland. It was created by the merger of the EIVD (School of Engineering of the State of Vaud) and the HEG-VD (School of Business of the State of Vaud) on August 1, 2004. With its 2000 students, the HEIG-VD is the largest branch of the University of Applied Sciences Western Switzerland (HES-SO) and participates actively in regional, national, and international research and industry development in all areas covered by its teaching.

As of fall 2006, HEIG-VD is based at a larger urban campus of three adjacent sites at Yverdon-les-Bains: Route de Cheseaux, Centre St-Roch, and Centre Y-Parc.

Bachelor programs
 Geomatics
 Electrical Engineering
 Systems Engineering
 Microengineering
 Telecommunications
 Computer Science
 Media Engineering
 Business Administration
 Engineering and Management

Master programs
Master programs are offered in partnership with other HES-SO members. A portion of the instruction will take place at HEIG-VD and another will take place at other HES-SO universities.

Master of Science in Engineering
Started in September 2009, this Master program offer two different majors :
 Industrial Technologies (TIN)
 Information and Communication Technologies (TIC)

Master of Science in Business Administration
Launched at the start of the 2008/2009 academic year, this master offer five different majors :
 Entrepreneurship (syllabus in English/French or English/German)
 Integrated Management of Information and Communication Systems
 Service Management and Service Engineering
 Public and Quasi-public Management
 Hospitality & Tourism (syllabus in English and French)

See also
List of largest universities by enrollment in Switzerland

References

External links
 Official website - Home page (french)
 Official website - International section (english)

Universities of Applied Sciences in Switzerland